Bernard William "Berne" Nadal (born Bernard William Nadal, but also known as "Berne Nadall"; 1869–1932) was an American typeface designer and artist. He was the designer of the Caslon Antique typeface, which is still in common use to this day.

Life
Bernard was born in Louisville, Kentucky on February 28, 1869. His mother was a French art teacher. After the death of his mother, he was placed under the instruction of H. Clay Wool ford, a prominent artist of the South, but they did not work well together. 

Two years later, Mr. Nadal began studying with Al. Legras, a classmate of Carl Brenner. Afterwards, he went to the Louisville School of Design for a term and, in less than a year, began working for the Louisville daily papers: the Louisville Post, the Daily Commercial, etc... It was during his connection with the Post that he cartooned the "Newman Ward Granite Steal," an exposé of a swindle on the city, and the result was a suit for damages in the sum of $200,000 against his paper. Consequently, he left Louisville for Chicago where he was employed for a time in designing and decorating; his services were soon sought by printers and publishers. 

During this period he worked in designing initials, head and tailpieces, page ornaments and titles, until he found congenial work for Barnhart Brothers & Spindler, the "Great Western Type Foundry", of Chicago. It was there that Nadal designed the Caslon Antique typeface, Which has since been included in a number of popular works including Les Misérables, A Series of Unfortunate Events, and the 1985 reboot of the TV series The Twilight Zone. This proved an incentive to greater exertion and closer study, and he soon determined to go abroad to make a careful study of design in its application to the type founder's needs. He first went to Birmingham, England, and afterwards spent some months in Paris. He later returned to Birmingham.

References

 William E. Loy, 1900, Inland Printer, American Lithographer, Volume 25, p.382. 

1869 births
1932 deaths
American typographers and type designers
Artists from Louisville, Kentucky